Kalyna (Ukrainian: Калина, Viburnum opulus) is a symmetric block cipher. It supports block sizes of 128, 256 or 512 bits; the key length is either equal to or double the block size.

Kalyna was adopted as the national encryption standard of Ukraine in 2015 (standard DSTU 7624:2014) after holding Ukrainian national cryptographic competition. Kalyna is a substitution–permutation network and its design is based on the Rijndael (AES) encryption function having quite different key schedule, another set of four different S-boxes and increased MDS matrix size.

Kalyna has 10 rounds for 128-bit keys, 14 rounds for 256-bit keys and 18 rounds for 512-bit keys. Independent researchers proposed some attacks on reduced-round variants of Kalyna, but all of them have a very high complexity and none of them are practical.

References 
 Roman Oliynykov, Ivan Gorbenko, Oleksandr Kazymyrov, Victor Ruzhentsev, Oleksandr Kuznetsov, Yurii Gorbenko, Oleksandr Dyrda, Viktor Dolgov, Andrii Pushkaryov, Ruslan Mordvinov, Dmytro Kaidalov. A New Encryption Standard of Ukraine: The Kalyna Block Cipher. IACR Cryptology ePrint Archive, p650 (2015) https://eprint.iacr.org/2015/650
 Roman Oliynykov, Ivan Gorbenko, Viktor Dolgov and Viktor Ruzhentsev. Results of Ukrainian national public cryptographic competition. Tatra Mt. Math. Publ. 47 (2010), 99–113. DOI: 10.2478/v10127-010-0033-6 https://www.degruyter.com/view/j/tmmp.2010.47.issue-1/v10127-010-0033-6/v10127-010-0033-6.xml
 Roman Oliynykov. Kalyna block cipher presentation (in English) http://www.slideshare.net/oliynykov/kalyna-english
 Akshima, Donghoon Chang, Mohona Ghosh, Aarushi Goel, Somitra Kumar Sanadhya. Single Key Recovery Attacks on 9-Round Kalyna-128/256 and Kalyna-256/512. Volume 9558 of the series Lecture Notes in Computer Science, pp. 119–135. https://link.springer.com/chapter/10.1007/978-3-319-30840-1_8
 Riham Altawy, Ahmed Abdelkhalek, Amr M. Youssef. A Meet-in-the-Middle Attack on Reduced-Round Kalyna-b/2b. IEICE Transactions on Information and Systems, Vol. E99-D, No.4, pp. 1246–1250. http://search.ieice.org/bin/summary.php?id=e99-d_4_1246

External links
 Reference implementation of the Kalyna block cipher (DSTU 7624:2014)

K